The South Padre Island Convention Centre is a  facility located in downtown South Padre Island, Texas. It can accommodate groups from 20 to 2,500 in size. It hosts the annual South Padre Island Invitational, a college basketball tournament, and is the host for the 2011 NBA G-League Showcase.

Notable Events
The 2016 South Padre Island kite festival was held here.

Gallery

See also
South Padre Island, Texas

References

External links
 South Padre Island Convention Centre website

Convention centers in Texas
Indoor arenas in Texas
Sports venues in Texas
Buildings and structures in Cameron County, Texas